This is a list of Judge John Hodgman episodes produced and distributed since 2015 by Maximum Fun and hosted by humorist John Hodgman. Except where noted, every episode also features radio personality Jesse Thorn as co-host and "bailiff".

Since April 2012, titles of episodes are taken from suggestions posted on the show's official Facebook page by fans of the podcast.

Beginning in 2014, some episodes are dedicated to Hodgman and Thorn discussing and ruling on cases which were not selected for a full hearing. Each such episode in which they "clear the docket" is listed as a "docket episode" (in italics) in the episode description.

Overview

2015

2016

2017

2018

2019

2020

See also 
 Judge John Hodgman
 List of Judge John Hodgman episodes (2010–2014)

References

External links 
 Official website
 
 Judge John Hodgman on Feedburner

Judge John Hodgman
Maximum Fun